Happy Christmas Vol. 2 is a 1999 holiday music compilation album, the second in a series released by BEC Records featuring artists from a variety of styles who were signed to BEC and its parent label, Tooth & Nail Records.

Track listing

References

1999 Christmas albums
Christmas albums by American artists
Record label compilation albums
Happy Christmas albums
1999 compilation albums